Tri-City Airport  is a privately owned, public use airport located two nautical miles (4 km) southeast of the central business district of West Lafayette, a village in Coshocton County, Ohio, United States.

Facilities and aircraft 
Tri-City Airport covers an area of 10 acres (4 ha) at an elevation of 844 feet (257 m) above mean sea level. It has one runway designated 10/28 with a turf surface measuring 3,000 by 100 feet (914 x 30 m).

For the 12-month period ending July 22, 2010, the airport had 8,085 aircraft operations, an average of 22 per day: 99.9% general aviation and 0.1% military. At that time there were 6 aircraft based at this airport: 83% single-engine and 17% multi-engine.

References

External links 
 Aerial image as of April 1994 from USGS The National Map

Airports in Ohio
Buildings and structures in Coshocton County, Ohio
Transportation in Coshocton County, Ohio